The Turtle River is a river of Minnesota.  It is a tributary of the Bowstring River.

See also
List of rivers of Minnesota

References

External links
Minnesota Watersheds
USGS Hydrologic Unit Map - State of Minnesota (1974)

Rivers of Minnesota